Hammarplast is a Swedish company that manufactures plastic household products. It is a subsidiary of the Finnish Orthex Group.

The company was founded 1947 at Tingsryd in Sweden by the brothers Carl and Hugo Hammargren. One of its designers was Sigvard Bernadotte. 

It was owned by Perstorp 1980–1985. It was bought 2011 by Orthex Group of Finland.

References

Manufacturing companies of Sweden